Pietra, which means "stone" in Italian (petra is the Corsican equivalent) and is also known as "A biera corsa", is a brand of beer from the Mediterranean French island of Corsica.

History 
The Pietra Brewery opened in 1996. The name "Pietra" comes from Pietraserena, the Corsican home village of the brewery’s founder.

Pietra beer is a 6% ABV amber beer, brewed from a mix of malt and chestnut flour.  Chestnuts have always been used in Corsica as a cereal, but it was necessary to carry out studies for many years to validate the qualities of chestnut flour.  The high fermentability of chestnuts helps to maintain the beer's head and gives Pietra beer its golden colour.

The annual production of Pietra beer is over 25,000 hectolitres.

Other beers brewed by Pietra  
 Serena (5% ABV) has a very light head and is just slightly bitter.
 Colomba is an un-pasteurized white beer perfumed with herbes du maquis (strawberry tree, myrtle, cistus, and juniper).

Corsica Cola 

Pietra brewery has also produced Corsica Cola, a non-alcoholic soft drink, since 2003.

References 

Breweries of France